Caloramator, is a genus of bacteriae belonging to the Bacillota.

Species
Caloramator fervidus

References

Clostridiaceae
Bacteria genera